Pajarito Gómez is a 1965 Argentine comedy film directed by Rodolfo Kuhn. It was entered into the 15th Berlin International Film Festival. It was also selected as the Argentine entry for the Best Foreign Language Film at the 38th Academy Awards, but was not accepted as a nominee. The film is a satire of the promotional machine behind the Argentine pop stars of the 1960s.

In 2000, it was included in the list of The 100 Greatest Films of Argentine Cinema at number 27, after a poll conducted by the Museo del Cine Pablo Ducrós Hicken. In a new version of the survey organized in 2022 by the specialized magazines La vida util, Taipei and La tierra quema, presented at the Mar del Plata International Film Festival, the film reached the 22nd position.

Cast

 Héctor Pellegrini as Pajarito Gómez
 María Cristina Laurenz as Pajarito's fiancée
 Nelly Beltrán as Rosalía
 Lautaro Murúa as Gravini
 Alberto Fernández de Rosa as Bobby
 Maurice Jouvet
 Beatriz Matar
 Jorge Rivera López
 Federico Luppi
 Marta Gam
 Alberto Barcel
Francisco Urondo

See also
 List of submissions to the 38th Academy Awards for Best Foreign Language Film
 List of Argentine submissions for the Academy Award for Best Foreign Language Film

References

External links

1965 films
Argentine comedy films
Argentine satirical films
1960s Spanish-language films
1965 comedy films
Argentine black-and-white films
Films directed by Rodolfo Kuhn
1960s Argentine films